A curio cabinet is a specialised type of display case, made predominantly of glass with a metal or wood framework, for presenting collections of curios, like figurines or other interesting objects that invoke curiosity, and perhaps share a common theme. A curio cabinet may also be used to display a solitary object of special interest, such as a hand-crafted doll.

Description
While display cases for presenting products for sale (such as jewelry) are typically horizontal with a surface covered in felt, a curio cabinet is usually vertical with no felt. Most curio cabinets have glass on each side, glass shelves, and optionally a mirror at the back, to maximize visibility.

Another purpose of a curio cabinet is to protect the value of a collection, which it does by preventing contact by dust and vermin. For added security, a locked door or removable panel allows the collection to be seen, while protecting it from damage and theft.

See also
China cabinet
Cupboard
Stationery cabinet
Cabinet of curiosities

References

External links
Cabinet Painting

Cabinets (furniture)
Furniture
Glass art